is an anime adaptation of the Tekken fighting video game series by Namco. Produced by ASCII Corporation and Sony Music Entertainment Japan and animated by Studio Deen, it was originally released in Japan as a two-episode OVA in 1998, and as a full-length feature for Western releases. It's one of the first OVAs to use digital ink and paint.

The film's story is loosely based on the first game, where Kazuya is the main character and Heihachi is the Head of the Mishima Zaibatsu, and Tekken 2, which features Jun and Lei's investigation of the Zaibatsu's illegal activities, although it also incorporates some elements from Tekken 3.

Plot
As a child, Jun Kazama watches as Kazuya Mishima is thrown off a cliff by his ruthless father, Heihachi, who deems him as weak and kind-hearted. She attempts to locate him, but fails and Kazuya is presumed dead. Kazuya, however, only barely survives and swears revenge, selling his soul to the Devil in exchange for his own survival.

Sixteen years later, Jun works as an Interpol agent and is assigned with a partner, Lei Wulong, to investigate the Mishima Zaibatsu for alleged inhumane experiments on animals by infiltrating the upcoming King of Iron Fist Tournament. Kazuya also plans to enter, hoping for a chance at revenge. Heihachi's adopted son, Lee Chaolan, attempts numerous times to have Kazuya killed in advance by Nina and Anna Williams, as Heihachi plans to bequeath the Mishima Zaibatsu to Kazuya should Kazuya defeat him at the tournament. Neither are able to succeed. Jun and Lei board a boat heading for Mishima Island, where the tournament will take place, and Jun recognises Kazuya when he slips aboard. She confronts him in the gym about his past and attempts to persuade him to stand down, but Kazuya refuses, especially after Nina and Anna attack again and only barely fail to kill Kazuya.

On the day of the tournament, Lei infiltrates the island's underground facility along with another competitor, Jack, who seeks out Dr. Bosconovitch in order to cure his terminally-ill young companion, Jane. As they fight their way through numerous androids, Jack's arm is gashed and Lei discovers he is also an android. They finally locate Bosconovitch, who treats Jane and confesses the Mishima Zaibatsu's illegal activities to Lei. Meanwhile, Jun attempts to reach out to Kazuya, and arrives in time to stop him from murdering Michelle Chang, a fellow competitor also seeking revenge against Heihachi for burning her village and causing her parents' deaths. Lee unleashes a pack of genetically-enhanced dinosaurs into the field to kill Kazuya. One devours Anna while Nina escapes. Kazuya taps into his inner power and kills all but one of them before reaching the tower where Heihachi awaits him. After fighting his way past Lee, Kazuya confronts Heihachi and the two fight. In response, Lee activates the island's self-destruction sequence, intending to kill himself and take his family with him.

After taking a vicious beating, Kazuya succumbs to his power and viciously pummels Heihachi. Though it seems as if he will kill his father, Jun manages to reach into Kazuya's heart and enable him to expel the Devil, reverting him to his original self; Heihachi sucker-punches Jun and Kazuya and the three of them fall from the cliff. As the island begins to crumble, Lei, Jack, Jane, and Bosconovitch flee the facility; Jack sacrifices himself to hold the door open long enough for his friends to escape. The remaining competitors escape from the burning forest as Kazuya emerges with the unconscious Jun. They escape the island while Heihachi flees in a jet as the island explodes.

Sometime later, Jun is accosted by Jin, her young son with Kazuya; Kazuya's whereabouts are left unrevealed. Though Jun senses something is wrong, she dismisses Jin's concern and they walk home together.

Characters
Main

Secondary

Cameos in opening sequence
As Tekken 3 had only recently been released to arcades at the time of the film's release, several characters of that game appeared in the opening scene but do not appear in the actual film, such as Jin Kazama (adult), Ling Xiaoyu, Hwoarang, Eddy Gordo and Forest Law. Jin appears in the movie's epilogue, but as a child. Wang Jinrei and Kunimitsu also appear in the opening sequence.

Release
The first OVA was released in Japan on VHS and LaserDisc on January 21, 1998, with the second part being released on February 21.
A Region 2 DVD release of the OVA was released by SME Visual Works on November 22, 2000.

ADV Films announced they had licensed the OVA series in May 1998 at Project A-Kon 9. ADV edited both episodes into a single film, featuring a new soundtrack with alternative rock, punk rock and sludge metal music consisting of "The Meaning of Life" by The Offspring,  "Save Yourself" by Stabbing Westward, "Clean My Wounds" by Corrosion of Conformity, "Straight to Hell" by The Urge, and "Bonecrusher" by Soulhat.

Reception
Tekken: The Motion Picture was met with mixed reviews, and seen by many as an unsuccessful attempt to replicate the previous success of Street Fighter II: The Animated Movie. Entertainment Weekly called it "a punch-drunk, derivative Saturday-morning cartoon" that "saps every atom of magic from its source." Anime News Network gave the anime a C+, calling it "oddly mediocre in a genre filled with utter crap." Video game magazine Hyper gave it a score of 4/10, opining: "The action bears no resemblance to the games, and the animation is total garbage. The plot is also disturbingly similar to Enter the Dragon. This is one for all anime connoisseurs to avoid." For the English dub, Adam Dudley's performance as Kazuya was also criticized.

References

External links

1998 anime films
1998 anime OVAs
ADV Films
Aniplex
Anime films based on video games
Japanese martial arts films
Martial arts anime and manga
Martial arts tournament films
Tekken films
Japanese sports films
1998 martial arts films
1998 films
1990s American films